This list of nuclear power systems in space includes nuclear power systems that were flown to space, or at least launched in an attempt to reach space. Such used nuclear power systems include:
 radioisotope heater units (RHU) (usually produce heat by spontaneous decay of )
 miniaturized fission reactors (usually produce heat by controlled fission of highly enriched  and convert it to electricity using a thermionic converter)
Systems never launched are not included here, see Nuclear power in space.

Initial total power is provided as either electrical power (We) or thermal power (Wt), depending on the intended application.

See also 
Outer Space Treaty
List of high-altitude nuclear explosions
Nuclear power in space
List of artificial radiation belts
:Category:Nuclear-powered robots

References 

Derelict satellites orbiting Earth
 
Space-borne reactors
Space
Space